Thilini Sudhara Jayasinghe (Sinhalese: තිලිනි සුනාරි ජයසිංහ; Tamils: திலினி சுனாரி ஜயசிங்க; born 15 January 1985) is a Sri Lankan badminton player. Born in Peradeniya, Jayasinghe started playing badminton at age of 9, and has joined the national team in 2000. She attended Mahamaya College and was named Best Sports Woman in 2004. In 2006 and 2010, she competed at the Asian and Commonwealth Games. Jayasinghe also competed for Sri Lanka at the 2008 and 2012 Summer Olympics in the women's singles event. She is the first woman badminton player to have ever represented Sri Lanka at the Olympic Games.

Achievements

South Asian Games 
Women's singles

Women's doubles

BWF International Challenge/Series (2 titles, 9 runners-up) 
Women's singles

Women's doubles

Mixed doubles

  BWF International Challenge tournament
  BWF International Series tournament
  BWF Future Series tournament

References

External links
 
 

1985 births
Living people
Sportspeople from Kandy
Sri Lankan female badminton players
Badminton players at the 2008 Summer Olympics
Badminton players at the 2012 Summer Olympics
Olympic badminton players of Sri Lanka
Badminton players at the 2006 Asian Games
Badminton players at the 2010 Asian Games
Asian Games competitors for Sri Lanka
Badminton players at the 2006 Commonwealth Games
Badminton players at the 2010 Commonwealth Games
Commonwealth Games competitors for Sri Lanka
South Asian Games silver medalists for Sri Lanka
South Asian Games bronze medalists for Sri Lanka
South Asian Games medalists in badminton
20th-century Sri Lankan women
21st-century Sri Lankan women